Heighton is a surname. Notable people with the surname include:

Jim Heighton (born 1944), Canadian football player
Steven Heighton (born 1961), Canadian novelist and poet
William Heighton (19th century), leader of the Philadelphia Working Man's Party

See also
South Heighton
Huyton